Sidney Gross’ (died in 1969, at the age of 48) was an American artist and painter. His early style was influenced by the Social realism. He also drew on the Surrealist Movement that was just beginning the year he was born. By the time he was twenty, he was painting distinctively urban surrealism, while producing critically admired portraits, something he continued to do during his lifetime.

Career
Late in the 1940s and early into the 1950s, he experimented with various forms of abstract expressionism, including what one critic called amorphorism. These soft, diffuse, often numbered abstractions bore the title ‘Dusky’.
    
He continued to produce realistic portraits and semi-abstract portraits of the landscape of New York City. By the mid 1950s, he was producing large and dynamic works of Abstract Expressionism and finding a cliental at a time when other Abstract Expressionist artists were forced to band together to exhibit. Around 1960, his UFO and Probe Series began to include controlled abstractions against hard edge geometric fields of colors. In 1968, he had a joint exhibit with Mario Cooper at Lehigh University Art Gallery organized by Francis Quirk. At that time Lehigh purchased one of his UFO paintings. At his premature death, he was setting expressionistic forms in a wide bands of colors, separated by a white field. 
   
Throughout his relatively short career, he received critical acclaim and financial success.

Sidney Gross is listed in Who Is Who in the East,  Who Is Who in America annually 1957 to 1967, Who Is Who in American Art 1948 to 1969, and in Who Was Who in American Art. Essays about his work appear in Master Paintings  from the Butler Museum, Catalog of the Whitney Collection, and in Permanent Collection of the Wichita Art Museum, Jewish Artists by Jon Catagno, American Paintings of Today,  MOMA, as well as in exhibition catalogs of various museums and his one-man shows, more recently in a monograph for an exhibit in the 1990s, and the 2007 monograph Sidney Gross - A Vision Cut Short, Leonard Davenport and the ongoing biography project on the web at https://web.archive.org/web/20150925133242/http://www.lsdart.com/assets/Artist/grossbook.pdf. Reviews and illustrations appeared in Art News, Art Digest, Arts Magazine, American Art, and most of the then almost a dozen New York area newspapers.

Solo Shows

Contemporary Art Gallery, - NYC 1945-1959
Tirca Karlis Gallery, Provincetown - 1960, 1962
Frank Rehn Gallery, NYC - 1949, 1950, 1951, 1953, 1954, 1956, 1958, 1959, 1960, 1961, 1963, 1965, 1967, 1969, memorial 1972
Pinchpenny Gallery - Essex Ct 1959,1985?
Seasons Gallery, The Hague, The Netherlands - 1977
David David Gallery, Philadelphia 1991
Kaleidodscope Gallery, Sagamore, MA 1992
Gertrude Stein Gallery - 2000
Davenport & Fleming Gallery - 2007
Memorial exhibits in New York City, Baltimore, and Providence, RI.

Permanent Collections
Albright-Knox Art Gallery
Allentown Museum of Art - 1967
American Academy of Arts & Letters - Childe Hassam Fund - 2 paintings
Art Students League of NY
Baltimore Museum of Art - 1961, 1962
Block Museum (Northwestern) - 1996 
Brandeis University -1956
Butler Institute of American Art - 1953, 1961, 2004
Walter P. Chrysler Museum - 1960
Colby College - 1958
Columbia University - 1962
Cornell University - 1958
Corcoran Gallery of Art - 1961
Israel Museum of Art - Jerusalem - 1965
Guus Maris Collection
James Michner Collection - University of Texas - 1967
Lempert Institute - 20 paintings purchased 1948-52
Lehigh University Art Gallery -1 painting purchased "UFO No. 27" 1968
Morgan State College - 1961 - reproduction available
Muscarelle Museum of Art (College of William & Mary)
New York University 
Norfolk Museum of Art 
Oklahoma Art Center - 1968
Philbrook Art Center - 1966
Provincetown Art Museum -1969, 1985, 1989
Princeton Museum - before 1953
Mt. Holyhoke University - 1950
Michigan State University - 1960,1966
Norfolk Museum 1963
Riverside Museum - 1959, 1963, 1966
Standard Financial Corporation 1958, 1959, 1960
Smithsonian American Art Museum (3) 1975
Syracuse University - 1963, 1965
Washington Gallery of Modern Art - 1962
Whitney Museum - 1945, 1946, 1955 
Walker Art Center 1948?
Wichita Art Museum - 1987
University of Georgia - 1949
University of Illinois - 1949
University of Omaha - 1951
University of Maryland 1965
University of Rochester - 1966

Date indicates when entered in collection. Painting may no longer be in the collection or the institution may have since closed.

Invitational Exhibits
Pennsylvania Academy of Art - multiple exhibits beginning 1945 and when he was a student
Carnegie Museum of Art - multiple exhibits beginning 1945
Whitney Museum - multiple exhibits beginning 1945
Armory Show - 1945
Brooklyn Museum - 1945
Pepsi Cola Traveling Exhibit - 1945, 1946 
Frank Rehn Gallery, NYC - 1946-1970s
Corcoran Museum of Art - multiple exhibits, including biennials 1953-63
Jewish Museum, NYC
University of Nebraska
National Academy of Design - 1946, 1948
Toledo Museum of Art - 1947
Audubon Artists - annually from 1947–67
Milwaukee Art Institute - 1946, 1951
Minneapolis Art Institute - 1946
Federation of Modern Painters & Sculptors - annually from 1947–67
Albright Art Gallery - 1947, 49, 1951
Museum of Modern Art - 1949, 1959, 1961
Hallmark Traveling Exhibit - 1949                Institute of Contemporary Art
	Corcoran Gallery
	Los Angeles County Museum
	City Art Museum of St. Louis
	W. R. Nelson Gallery, Kansas City
	Des Moines Art Center
	Detroit Institute of Arts
	Isaac Delgado Museum, New Orleans
	Carnegie Institute
	Albright Art Gallery, Buffalo
	Joslyn Art Museum, Omaha
 	Milwaukee Art Institute
Wildenstein Gallery - 1949
Virginia Museum of Fine Arts - 1949
University of Illinois - 1949
Metropolitan Museum of Art - 1950
Hallmark - National Tour - 1950-51
American Academy of Arts & Letters - 1950, 1955, 1958
Institute of Contemporary Art Boston - 1951
Nelson Gallery - 1951
Detroit Institute of Art - 1951
Des Moines Art Center - 1951
Isaac Delgado Museum - 1951
Montclair Art Museum - 1951
Hallmark - European tour - 1952
Butler Institute of American Art - beginning 1953
Joslyn Art Museum - 1954
Brazil - Contemporary Arts - 1956
Riverside Museum - multiple since 1957
American Federation of Arts - 1958-60
Zabriskie Gallery, NYC 1958
Puerto Rico - 1959
Art USA - 1958, 1959
Washington Gallery of MA - 1962, 1966
YMHA &YWHA of Elizabeth - 1963
Poindexter Gallery - 1963
National Institute of Arts & Letters - 1967
Artists for SEDF - 1967
Lehigh University Art Galleries - 1968
Maryland Arts Council at the Peale Museum - 1968 (then travelled throughout the state)
Baltimore Museum of Art Invitational - 1968
Art Expo/New York - GIN gallery - 1980
Hillstrom Museum of Art, MN - 2007
L.I. Museum at Stony Brook - 2008
Davenport & Fleming - 2010
Gilbert Pavilion Gallery - 2011
Davenport & Shapiro Fine Art - 2012-13

References 

20th-century American artists
1969 deaths
Year of birth missing